Kim Polling (born 8 February 1991) is a Dutch judoka competing in the women's 70 kg division.   Quadruple European Champion Kim Polling was World #1 for 3 years. She bagged the Grand Slam gold in Antalya in 2021. She won various different Grand Slams. She took gold at the Grand Slam in Abu Dhabi 2019 and the Grand Prix in The Hague in 2017. Polling was World and European Junior Champion in 2010. Polling took bronze at the World Championships in 2013. Polling won four Judo World Masters in 2014, 2015, 2016 and 2019. She took gold at the 2016 Grand Prix Tbilisi and Grand Prix in Tunis in 2018. She took bronze at the 2021 Judo World Masters in Doha, Qatar in 2021.

In 2021, she won one of the bronze medals in her event at the 2021 Judo World Masters held in Doha, Qatar.

References

External links

 
 
 

1991 births
Living people
Dutch female judoka
European Games gold medalists for the Netherlands
European Games medalists in judo
Judoka at the 2015 European Games
People from Leek, Netherlands
Judoka at the 2016 Summer Olympics
Olympic judoka of the Netherlands
Universiade medalists in judo
Universiade gold medalists for the Netherlands
Judoka at the 2019 European Games
Medalists at the 2011 Summer Universiade
21st-century Dutch women
Sportspeople from Groningen (province)